The Gloucester–Newport line is a railway line that runs along the west bank of the River Severn in the United Kingdom between Gloucester and Newport.

Originally part of the South Wales Railway on the main route from London before the construction of the Severn Tunnel; today it is an important link between the West Midlands and South Wales.

Route
The places served by the route are:
 Gloucester
 Connections along the Golden Valley line to Swindon
 Lydney
 Connection with Dean Forest Railway
 Chepstow
 Caldicot
 Severn Tunnel Junction located in Rogiet
 Newport
 Connections with South Wales Main Line and Welsh Marches line

Local passenger services are currently provided by Transport for Wales, with an approximately hourly service in each direction on the Cheltenham Spa to Maesteg service. The intermediate stations are omitted except during the early morning and late evening.

Severn Tunnel Junction had important roles at this time as the junction for the Severn Tunnel, the large coal marshalling yards and a new diesel depot, replacing the previous steam locomotive depot. Severn Tunnel Junction also serves the village of Rogiet and is where this line merges with the South Wales Main Line through the Severn Tunnel, so it is also a stop on the Cardiff Central-Bristol Temple Meads-Portsmouth Harbour service.

In 1977 the Parliamentary Select Committee on Nationalised Industries recommended considering electrification of more of Britain's rail network, and by 1979 BR presented a range of options to do so by 2000. Options included electrifying numerous former Great Western routes including the Gloucester to Newport line. Under the 1979–90 Conservative governments that succeeded the 1976–79 Labour government the proposal was not implemented.

Accidents and incidents

References

Sources

External links
 Dudley Mall - Railway directory - Cheltenham Spa to Cardiff Central

Railway lines in Wales
Rail transport in Gloucestershire
Transport in Newport, Wales
Railway lines in South West England
Standard gauge railways in Wales
Standard gauge railways in England